Vanilla Gorilla may refer to:

Jason Witt (born 1986), American mixed martial artist
Vanilla Gorilla, a 2020 album by Riff Raff